The Llangollen Motor Museum is a small museum and autojumble source near Llangollen, Wales established in 1986.

Collection 
The museum has a collection of motoring memorabilia which includes more than sixty cars and motorcycles.

References

External links 
 

Automobile museums in Wales
Museums in Denbighshire
Llangollen
1986 establishments in Wales
Museums established in 1986